Roger Béchirian  is an English engineer and record producer.  Béchirian was a key player in the British new wave scene of the late 1970s and early 1980s, best known for his work with Nick Lowe, Paul Carrack, Elvis Costello, The Undertones, Dave Edmunds, The Monkees, the Flamin' Groovies, and Squeeze.  He was also a member of the pseudonymous new wave group Blanket of Secrecy, which issued one album in 1982.  More recently, Béchirian has worked with the Trashcan Sinatras and Bell X1.

Life and career
He became renowned for his mixing work for Stiff Records, which paved the way for his first co-produced hit, Lene Lovich’s “Lucky Number”. He is widely credited for moulding the sound of some of that period’s finest hitmakers including Elvis Costello, The Undertones, and Squeeze.

Building on his early successes Béchirian spent his time working between the UK and the USA developing and producing new and established artists for major and independent label releases. By the beginning of the new millennium he added management to his skill set. He discovered and developed Tom McRae signing him to db/BMG/Arista records, whose emergence led to a Q Award and nominations for a Mercury Prize Award, and a Brit Award. At the same time he managed Irish four-piece Bell X1, signing them to Island/Universal in London, garnering four Choice Music Prize Irish Album of the Year nominations and producing their breakthrough multi-platinum album Flock.

Discography overview

Note: engineered (e), mixed (m), co-produced (cp), produced (p)

Elvis Costello: e-m-cp-p

albums:
 My Aim Is True (remixes)
 This Years Model
 Armed Forces
 Get Happy!!
 Trust
singles:
 "(What's So Funny 'Bout) Peace, Love, and Understanding"
 "Oliver's Army"
 "Alison" (remix)
 "(I Don't Want to Go to) Chelsea"
 "Accidents Will Happen"
 "Pump It Up"
 "I Can't Stand Up for Falling Down"
 "Radio Radio"
 "Big Tears"
 "Green Shirt"
 "High Fidelity"
 "New Lace Sleeves"
 "Talking in the Dark"
 "New Amsterdam"
 "Riot Act"
 "Clubland"
 "From a Whisper to a Scream"
 "Watch Your Step"

Squeeze: e-m-p

albums:
 East Side Story
singles:
 "Is That Love"
 "Tempted"
 "Labelled With Love"
 "Messed Around"

The Undertones: e-m-p

albums:
 The Undertones
 Hypnotised
 Positive Touch 
singles:
 "Get Over You"
 "Jimmy Jimmy"
 "Here Comes the Summer"
 "You've Got My Number (Why Don't You Use It?)"
 "My Perfect Cousin"
 "Wednesday Week"
 "It's Going To Happen!
 "Julie Ocean"

Nick Lowe: e-m-cp-p

albums:
 Jesus of Cool
 Nick the Knife
 The Abominable Showman
singles:
 "So It Goes"
 "Marie Provost"
 "Endless Sleep"
 "Halfway to Paradise"
 "I Love the Sound of Breaking Glass"	
 "Little Hitler"
 "American Squirm" 	
 "Crackin' Up" 	
 "Cruel to Be Kind"
 "Cool Reaction"
 "Ragin' Eyes"
 "Wish You Were Here"

Graham Parker: e-m

albums:
 Howlin' Wind
 Heat Treatment
 Stick to Me

Twist: e-m-cp

albums:
 This Is Your Life
singles:
 "This Is Your Life"
 "Ads"

The Rumour: e-m-cp

albums:
 Frogs Sprouts Clogs and Krauts
singles:
 "Emotional Traffic"
 "Frozen Years"
 "Tired of Waiting"

The Jam: e
 "Going Underground" (single)

Lene Lovich: e-m-p

albums:
 Stateless
 Flex
singles:
 "Lucky Number"
 "Little Bird"
 "Too Tender To Touch"
 "I Think We're Alone Now"

Wang Chung: e-m-p

albums:
 Huang Chung
singles:
 "Hold Back the Tears"
 "China"
 "Ti Na Na"

Carlene Carter: e-m-p-cp

albums:
 Carlene Carter
 C'est C Bon
 Blue Nun
singles:
 "When You Comin' Back" 
 "Too Many Teardrops"
 "Love Like A Glove"
 "Meant It for a Minute"

Dave Edmunds: e-m

albums:
 Tracks on Wax 4
 Repeat When Necessary
singles:
 "Deborah"
 "Television"
 "A1 on the Jukebox"
 "Girls Talk"
 "Queen of Hearts"
 "Crawling from the Wreckage"

The Trash Can Sinatras: e-m-p

albums:
 Cake
singles:
 "Only Tongue Can Tell"
 "Obscurity Knocks"

Bell X1: m-p

albums:
 Music in Mouth
 Flock
 Blue Lights on the Runway (re-mixes)
singles:
 "Man on Mir"
 "White Water Song"
 "Tongue"
 "Snakes and Snakes"
 "Alphabet Soup"
 "Eve, the Apple of My Eye"
 "Next to You"
 "Bigger Than Me"
 "Flame"
 "Rocky Took a Lover"
 "The Great Defector"-m
 "The Ribs of a Broken Umbrella"-m

Tom McRae: cp-m

albums:
 Tom McRae
singles:
 "You Cut Her Hair"
 "Walking to Hawaii" rm

Flamin' Groovies: e-m-cp
 Jumpin' in the Night

The Attractions: e-m-p
 Mad About the Wrong Boy

The Shakin' Pyramids: e-m-p
 Celts and Cobras

The Monkees: e-m-p
 Pool It! (album)

The dB's: e-m-p
 "Judy" (single)

Tony Koklin: e-m-p
 Time Chaser

Robert Ellis Orrall: e-m-p
 Special Pain
 Walking Thru Landmines

Rockpile: e-m
 Pile Of Rocks

The Photos: e-m-p
 The Photos

Siouxsie and the Banshees: e-m
 "New Skin" (from Showgirls)

Blanket of Secrecy: e-m-p
 Ears Have Walls

The Passion Puppets: e-m-p
 "Like Dust"

Dirty Looks: e-m
 Dirty Looks

The Pretenders: e-m
 "Stop Your Sobbing" (single)

Stewart Agnew Band: e-m-p
 Stewart Agnew

Bear Driver: cp
 "Wolves" (single)

e and ae: 
Joe Jackson 
Paul Jones
The Sex Pistols
The Bay City Rollers
TV21
The Three Degrees
Wreckless Eric
Clive Langer
Barbara Dixon
Jona Lewie
Larry Wallis
Telephone
Maxine Nightingale
Shirley Bassey
Kathy Kirby
Simon May
Paul & Barry Ryan
Dolly Mixtures
Hello
Clover
Huey Lewis
The Damned
The Belle Stars
Marc Bolan
The Three Degrees
Jethro Tull
David Essex

References

External links
 Roger Béchirian on Trick Management
 Sound on Sound interview
 Roger Béchirian official website

Living people
Musicians from Kolkata
English record producers
English audio engineers
English new wave musicians
Year of birth missing (living people)